Michael Brunswijk (born 2 May 1979) is a Dutch former footballer who played for Eerste Divisie club FC Oss during the 2001–03 football seasons.

Club career
Brunswijk played amateur football for clubs such as  Alexandria '66, DCV, Leonidas, TONEGIDO, Delta Sport and DHC. He was also on the books of professional sides Excelsior and RKC.

Personal life
Brunswijk is the nephew of former Real Madrid and Netherlands international Royston Drenthe.

References

1979 births
Living people
Dutch footballers
Footballers from Rotterdam
TOP Oss players
DHC Delft players
Eerste Divisie players
RKSV Leonidas players
Association football defenders
VSV TONEGIDO players